Oliver Joakim Wahlström (born June 13, 2000) is a Swedish American professional ice hockey forward for the New York Islanders of the National Hockey League (NHL). He was selected by the Islanders, 11th overall, in the 2018 NHL Entry Draft.

Playing career
Wahlström played for the USA Hockey National Team Development Program in the 2016–17 and 2017–18 seasons, where he served as an alternate captain for the Under-18 Team in his final season. He originally committed to play for the University of Maine when he was just thirteen years old, becoming the first player born in the 2000s to commit to play college hockey, as well as the youngest player ever to commit to play college hockey, before switching his commitment to Harvard University for the 2018–19 season, and finally to Boston College.

In the 2018–19 season, Wahlström scored 8 goals and 11 assists for 19 points as a freshman in 36 games. At the conclusion of the Eagles' season, Wahlstrom concluded his collegiate career by agreeing to a three-year, entry-level contract with the New York Islanders on March 28, 2019.

Wahlström made his NHL debut on October 14, 2019, against the St. Louis Blues.

On August 31, 2020, Wahlström was loaned by the Islanders to Swedish club, AIK of the HockeyAllsvenskan, to start the 2020–21 season. He returned from his loan spell on December 14.

Wahlström scored his first NHL goal on January 28, 2021, in the Islanders' 6–3 loss to the Washington Capitals. His first multipoint game occurred on February 28, 2021, with a goal and an assist in a 2–0 win against the Penguins.

Wahlström’s first NHL playoff goal came on May 22, 2021, at Nassau Coliseum in a 4–1 win against the Pittsburgh Penguins. It also marked his first postseason power play goal.

Personal life
Wahlström grew up in Cumberland, Maine. He is a dual citizen of the United States and Sweden through his father. His father played at the University of Maine before playing professionally in Sweden. He has one sister, Alexandra, who was born in Sweden. His mother, Penny Wahlstrom, lives in Maine.  Wahlström scored a highlight goal at the age of 9 during a shootout contest before a Bruins game in 2009.

Career statistics

Regular season and playoffs

International

References

External links
 

2000 births
Living people
AIK IF players
American people of Swedish descent
American men's ice hockey right wingers
Boston College Eagles men's ice hockey players
Bridgeport Sound Tigers players
Ice hockey players at the 2016 Winter Youth Olympics
Ice hockey people from Maine
National Hockey League first-round draft picks
New York Islanders draft picks
New York Islanders players
People from Cumberland, Maine
People from Yarmouth, Maine
USA Hockey National Team Development Program players
Youth Olympic gold medalists for the United States